Gimme the Power may refer to:
 Gimme the Power (2012 film), a Mexican documentary film
 Gimme the Power (2000 film), a Mexican crime film